Arndell Park is a predominantly industrial suburb in the City of Blacktown, in Western Sydney, in the state of New South Wales, Australia. Its postcode is 2148.

History
The suburb takes its name from Thomas Arndell who was appointed Assistant Surgeon to the settlement in New South Wales and arrived with the First Fleet. He later joined Captain Tench in 1789 in the journey of exploration from Prospect Hill to the Nepean River.

Retail and commercial services
There is a retail and commercial mall in Arndell Park comprising an Aldi discount supermarket, a Subway restaurant, a Gloria Jean's coffee store, a solicitors office, a medical centre, a bottle shop, OurCellar and several discount stores and food outlets.

References

The 2001 City of Blacktown Social Plan 

Suburbs of Sydney
City of Blacktown